Nathan Alterman (August 14, 1910 – March 28, 1970) was an Israeli poet, playwright, journalist, and translator. Though never holding any elected office, Alterman was highly influential in Socialist Zionist politics, both before and after the establishment of the modern State of Israel in 1948.

Biography
Nathan Alterman was born in Warsaw, Poland (then part of the Russian Empire). In 1925, when he was 15 years old, the family moved to Tel Aviv and he continued his studies at the Herzliya Hebrew High School.

When he was 19 years old, he travelled to Paris to study at the University of Paris (a.k.a. La Sorbonne), but a year later he decided to go to Nancy to study agronomy. Though maintaining close contacts with his family and friends in Tel Aviv and visiting them on vacations, Alterman spent three years in France and was highly influenced by his occasional meetings with French artists and writers. On his return to Tel Aviv in 1932, he started working at the Mikveh Yisrael agricultural school, but soon left it in favour of working as a journalist and poet.

In 1933, when Alterman was 33 years old, he joined the literary circle "Together". Members of that literary group published the literary magazine "Columns" and rebelled against the literary establishment of that time, identified with the poet Hayim Nahman Bialik and his followers.

On the 22nd of August, 1934, he married Rachel Marcus, an actress in "The Cameri Theatre"
In January 1941 their only daughter was born: Tirtza Atar, who would grow up to become a poetess herself.

Alterman is credited with bringing the seeds of the marmande tomato to Israel, where it was the main species cultivated in the country until the 1960s.

Literary  career
In 1933, when he was 23 years old, Alterman began to write songs for the vaudeville theatre "The Broom"."

In 1934, he began to publish in the daily newspaper Davar a rhymed column named "Tel Aviv Sketches". that addressed current affairs and during four months 26 of these rhymed columns were published.

In November 1934 he left Davar and began to publish in the daily newspaper Haaretz a similar column named "Moments" but this time the columns had a less lyrical and more satirical nature, and he continued to publish these columns for eight years during which he published a total of 297 columns.

Alterman's first published book of poetry was Kokhavim Bakhuts ("Stars Outside"), published in 1938. This volume, with its "neo-romantic themes, highly charged texture, and metrical virtuosity," as Israeli critic Benjamin Harshav puts it, established him as a major force in modern Hebrew literature.

His next major book was "The Joy of the Poor" ( ṡimḥàt aniyím, 1941). This is a kaleidoscopic phantasmagoria consisting of 31 interconnected poems, all from the viewpoint of the ghost of a dead man obsessed with the living woman he loves – a reversal of the Orpheus and Eurydice story. The dead man wants to protect his living love from war and poverty, but more than anything he wants to drag her into his world. His plans are continually frustrated. The light from a humble candle is enough to drive him back. The story reads like a supernatural thriller, but the rhyme and the meters are regular and elegant.

In 1942, when the first news about the Holocaust reached the Zionist Jewish community in British Mandate Palestine, Alterman wrote a poem, which can be described as a sarcastic paraphrase on the Jewish prayer, "Praised are You ... who has chosen us out of all the nations". In this poem Alterman says, "At our children's cry, shadowed by scaffolds, we heard not the world's furor. For you have chosen us out of all nations, you loved and favoured us. For you have chosen us of all nations, of Norwegians, Czechs and Britons. As they march toward scaffolds, Jewish children of reason, they know their blood shan't be reckoned among the rest, they just call to the mother 'turn away your face'." In 1943, Alterman wrote the maqama "The Swedish Tongue", in which he praised Sweden's willingness to welcome Jewish refugees from Denmark.

In 1943, he also wrote a poem that was critical of Pope Pius XII, a poem that is featured at the Yad Vashem museum.

In 1945–1947, Alterman's weekly column in the Labour Movement "Davar" newspaper denounced the British army's oppressive measures and praising the illegal immigrant boats landing Jewish holocaust survivors on the country's shores, in defiance of British policy. The most well-known of these is the 1945 "In Praise of an Italian Captain".

In the early stages of the 1948 Arab–Israeli War he wrote numerous patriotic poems, the most well-known of which is "The Silver Platter" ( magásh ha-késef). Having become a canonical text read on Israel's Remembrance Day, this poem was written in response to Chaim Weizmann's words in December 1947, after the adoption of the UN Partition Plan for Palestine, "No state is ever handed on a silver platter... The partition plan does not give the Jews but an opportunity". In his poem, Alterman describes a scene similar to the Biblical Revelation on Mount Sinai, where the Jewish People are waiting to receive the Jewish state, as the Israelite were waiting to receive the Torah. And yet, instead of Moses descending with the Tablets of Stone, the people see two unfamiliar youths, a boy and a girl, wounded and near dead with exhaustion. When asked, "Who are you?" they reply, "We are the silver platter on which the state of the Jews was handed to you".

Alterman translated Shakespeare, Molière, Racine, Gozzi, Molnar, Lully, Dostoevsky, Bernard Shaw, Ionesco, Courteline, Priestley, Barrie, Anouilh, de Beaumarchais, Jonson,Labiche, Ostrovsky into Hebrew and Yiddish. He wrote the lyrics of the famous Moshe Vilenski song Kalaniyot, sung by Shoshana Damari.

Some of Alterman's poems have been turned into popular songs, e.g.,  "A meeting with no end" (פגישה לאין קץ). An episode in Season 3 of the Israeli Netflix show Shtisel is named after one of his poems, "First Smile," which is read at a memorial service during the show. An English-language translation of "First Smile" by Robert Friend (from Found in Translation, Toby Press, 2006) is also included in the episode.

Political activism
During the 1950s, Alterman was opposed to the martial law imposed at the time on Israel's Arab citizens (until 1966), and was also strongly supportive of workers' struggle such as the 1952 sailors' strike which was suppressed by the Ben Gurion Government.

After the Six-Day War, Alterman was one of the founders of the Movement for Greater Israel finding himself in alliance with right-wing activists whom he greatly opposed in earlier times of his career. He criticized David Ben-Gurion (who only held at the time the position of a Knesset member, but was still influential) for being too willing to give up the territories captured during the war in return for a peace agreement.

Awards and recognition

Alterman has been featured on Israel's NIS 200 bill since 2016.

 In 1946, Alterman received the Tchernichovsky Prize for exemplary translation, for his translations of plays Phèdre by Jean Racine and Merry Wives of Windsor by Shakespeare.
 In 1947, he received the Ruppin Prize for his book "Joy of the Poor".
 In 1957, Alterman was awarded the Bialik Prize for literature.
 In 1967, he again received the Tchernichovsky Prize, for translations of the plays of Moliere.
 In 1968, he was awarded the Israel Prize, for literature.
 In 2011, his portrait was chosen to be on Israel's currency.

Books (Hebrew)

Poetry 
 Stars Outside. Yachdav  Publishing, 1938; Machbarot Lesifrut Publishing, 1945; Hakibbutz Hameuchad Publishing House, 1995
 Joy of the Poor. Machbarot Lesifrut Publishing, 1941
 Plague Poems. Machbarot Lesifrut Publishing, 1944
 The Seventh Column [vol. 1]. Am Oved Publishing, 1948; New editions: Hakibbutz Hameuchad Publishing House, 2003; 2004 
 The Seventh Column [vol. 2] . Davar, 1954
 City of the Dove . Machbarot Lesifrut Publishing, 1957
  Poems of Ten Brothers  . Machbarot Lesifrut Publishing, 1961
 Summer Celebration. Machbarot Lesifrut, 1965
 Pythagoras' Trial . Machbarot Lesifrut, 1965
 Moments. Hakibbutz Hameuchad Publishing House, 1974
 The Silver Platter: Selected Poems . Ministry of Defense, 1974
 The Front Stand. Hakibbutz Hameuchad Publishing House, Mosad Alterman,  1980
 From: Stars Outside, Joy of the Poor, Plague Poems, City of the Dove. Hakibbutz Hameuchad Publishing House, 1980
 Poems 1931-1935. Hakibbutz Hameuchad Publishing House, 1984
 In Praise of Frivolity . Hakibbutz Hameuchad Publishing House, 1997
 Poems of Yore (}). Hakibbutz Hameuchad Publishing House, 1999
 The Seventh Column : Israeli Art from the Benno Kalev's Collection. Hakibbutz Hameuchad Publishing House, 2000

Plays 
 Kinneret, Kinneret . Hakibbutz Hameuchad Publishing House, 1962
 Ghosts' Inn . Amikam, 1963
 Esther the Queen. Hakibbutz Hameuchad Publishing House, 1966
 Last Days of Ur . Hakibbutz Hameuchad Publishing House, 1990

Children-Picture Books 
 The Tenth Chick . Machbarot Lesifrut Publishing, 1943; new editions - Hakibbutz Hameuchad Publishing House, 1973, 2005 
 The Singing Book of Friendship . Machbarot Lesifrut, 1958
 The Puzzle Book. Hakibbutz Hameuchad Publishing House, 1971
 To Children. Hakibbutz Hameuchad Publishing House, 1972
 Og King of Bashan. Hakibbutz Hameuchad Publishing House, 1975, new edition 2011
 Rhymes for children. Hakibbutz Hameuchad Publishing House, ;1976 new edition 2002
 What a Wonder. Hakibbutz Hameuchad Publishing House, 1983
 A Tale of a Small Chirik. Hakibbutz Hameuchad Publishing House, 2003
 A Tale of a Final Pe. Hakibbutz Hameuchad Publishing House, 2000
 It All Happened at Hannuka. Hakibbutz Hameuchad Publishing House, 2001

Songs 
 Love Poems. Hakibbutz Hameuchad Publishing House, 1998
 Tel-Aviv Serenade. Hakibbutz Hameuchad Publishing House, 1999
 You Should Ring Twice. Hakibbutz Hameuchad Publishing House, Israel Broadcasting Authority , 2002

Satire 
 The Final Mask. Maariv, 1968

Non-Fiction 
 Breaking the Circle. Hakibbutz Hameuchad Publishing House, 1971
 The Triangular Thread. Hakibbutz Hameuchad Publishing House, 1971
 The Alterman Notebooks [Vol A]. Hakibbutz Hameuchad Publishing House together with Katz Research Institute for Hebrew Literature, Tel-Aviv University, 1977
 Little Tel Aviv. Hakibbutz Hameuchad Publishing House, 1979
 The Alterman Notebooks [Vol B]. Hakibbutz Hameuchad Publishing House and Mosad Alterman, 1979
 The Alterman Notebooks [Vol C]. Hakibbutz Hameuchad Publishing House and Mosad Alterman, 1981
 Between the Poet and the Statesman. Hakibbutz Hameuchad Publishing House, 1981, ext. ed. Hakibbutz Hameuchad Publishing House, Mosad Alterman, 1986
 The Alterman Notebooks [Vol D]. Hakibbutz Hameuchad Publishing House, 1986
 Both Roads. Hakibbutz Hameuchad Publishing House, Mosad Alterman, 1989
 Essays and Articles. Hakibbutz Hameuchad Publishing House, 2019

See also 
 List of Bialik Prize recipients
 List of Israel Prize recipients

References

Further reading
The Modern Hebrew Poem Itself  (2003),

External links
 Nathan Alterman on the Poetry International Web
 Tsur Erlich, "Nathan the Wise", Azure (Spring 2007)
 N. Alterman – Israel and Zionism
 Poetry International Web Israel – Nathan Alterman
 Yossi Banai reading Nathan Alterman

1910 births
1970 deaths
20th-century Israeli poets
Modern Hebrew writers
Israeli columnists
Israel Prize in literature recipients
Israeli male dramatists and playwrights
Herzliya Hebrew Gymnasium alumni
Israeli Ashkenazi Jews
Ashkenazi Jews in Mandatory Palestine
Israeli people of Polish-Jewish descent
Writers from Warsaw
Hebrew-language poets
University of Paris alumni
20th-century Israeli dramatists and playwrights
Polish emigrants to Mandatory Palestine
Polish expatriates in France
Translators to Hebrew
English–Hebrew translators
French–Hebrew translators
Translators to Yiddish
Translators from Russian
Israeli agronomists
Burials at Kiryat Shaul Cemetery
20th-century translators
Mandatory Palestine expatriates in France
20th-century agronomists